Erhan is a Turkish given of raw Turkic origin, with the combination of word “Er” and “Han”, and is a name for males.
It has the meanings "Soldier King, or Soldier Khan'. Er means Soldier and Han means Khan. It is a Turkish name.

Given name
 Erhan Albayrak (born 1977), Turkish football player
 Erhan Altın (born 1956), Turkish football player and manager
 Erhan Aydın (born 1981), Turkish football player
 Erhan Çinlar (born 1941), Turkish American probabilist and Professor Emeritus in Engineering at Princeton University
 Erhan Deniz (born 1985), Turkish kickboxer
 Erhan Dünge (born 1980), Turkish volleyball player
 Erhan Emre (born 1978), Turkish–German actor, director, film producer and writer
 Erhan Güven (born 1982), Turkish football player 
 Erhan Kartal (born 1993), Turkish footballer
 Erhan Can Kartal (born 1998), Turkish actor
 Erhan Kavak (born 1987), Turkish-Swiss football player
 Erhan Kuşkapan (born 1988), Turkish football player
 Erhan Mašović (born 1998), Serbian football player
 Erhan Namlı (born 1974), Turkish football player
 Erhan Şentürk (born 1989), Turkish football player

Middle name
 Mehmet Erhan Tanman (born 1989), Turkish composer

Surname
 Iulian Erhan (born 1986), Moldovan football player
 Pantelimon Erhan (1884–1971), Moldovan politician and prime minister of the Moldavian Democratic Republic (1917–1918)

Turkish masculine given names